KONA-FM (105.3 MHz) is a radio station broadcasting a Top 40 (CHR) format.  Licensed to Kennewick, Washington, United States, the station serves the Tri-Cities area.  The station is owned by Townsquare Media and features programming from Westwood One and Premiere Radio Networks. 

On June 30, 2022, KONA-FM changed format from hot AC (as "Mix 105.3") to Top 40/CHR as "105.3 Kiss FM" shortly after Townsquare Media closed the deal following the sale of Cherry Creek Media.

References

External links

ONA-FM
Radio stations established in 1969
Townsquare Media radio stations